These towns and villages in India are called Velur, Veloor, or Vellore:

Velur, Tuticorin, Tamil Nadu
Velur, Namakkal, Tamil Nadu
Velur, Thanjavur, Tamil Nadu
Velur, Thrissur, Kerala
Veloor, Kottayam, Kerala
Vellore, Tamil Nadu